The Synod of Rome may refer to a number of synods or councils of the Roman Catholic Church, held in Rome.

Some of these synods include:

Synod of Rome (313), attended by the bishop of Beneventum, and Reticius, bishop of Autun
Council of Rome (382), a meeting of Christian Church officials and theologians under the authority of Pope Damasus I
Synod of Rome (465), attended by Concordius, bishop of Bari
Synod of Rome (499), attended by Saint Justus, bishop of Acerenza and Menecrates, bishop of Cariati
Synod of Rome (721), a synod held in St. Peter's Basilica under the authority of Pope Gregory II 
Synods of Rome (727), held under the authority of Pope Gregory II 
Synods of Rome (731), two synods held in St. Peter's Basilica under the authority of Pope Gregory III 
Synod of Rome (732), a synod held in Rome under the authority of Pope Gregory III
 Synod of Rome (745) held under the authority of Pope Zachary
Synod of Rome (898) Multiple councils held by John the XI to rectify the wrongs of the Cadaver Synod
Synod of Rome (963), a possibly uncanonical synod held in St. Peter's Basilica under the authority of the Holy Roman Emperor to depose Pope John XII
Synod of Rome (964),  a synod held in St. Peter's Basilica, for the purpose of condemning the Synod of Rome (963) and to depose Pope Leo VIII

Rome